(known in English as Art Forms in Nature) is a book of lithographic and halftone prints by German biologist Ernst Haeckel.

Publication

Originally published in sets of ten between 1899 and 1904 and collectively in two volumes in 1904, it consists of 100 prints of various organisms, many of which were first described by Haeckel himself.

Themes

According to Haeckel scholar Olaf Breidbach, the work was "not just a book of illustrations but also the summation of his view of the world."  The over-riding themes of the  plates are symmetry and level of organization.  The subjects were selected to embody these to the full, from the scale patterns of boxfishes to the spirals of ammonites to the perfect symmetries of jellies and microorganisms, while images composing each plate are arranged for maximum visual impact.

Among the notable prints are numerous radiolarians, which Haeckel helped to popularize among amateur microscopists; at least one example is found in almost every set of 10.  Cnidaria also feature prominently throughout the book, including sea anemones as well as Siphonophorae, Semaeostomeae, and other medusae.  The first set included Desmonema annasethe (now Cyanea annasethe), a particularly striking jellyfish that Haeckel observed and described shortly after the death of his wife Anna Sethe.

Influence

  One prominent example is the Amsterdam Commodities Exchange designed by Hendrik Petrus Berlage: it was in part inspired by  illustrations.

Gallery of prints 
Haeckel's original classifications appear in italics.

See also
 On Growth and Form

References

Breidbach, Olaf.  Visions of Nature: The Art and Science of Ernst Haeckel.  Prestel Verlag: Munich, 2006.

External links

 Marine Biological Laboratory Library - An exhibition of material on Haeckel, including background on many  plates.
 

Natural history
Biology books
Science in art
1899 non-fiction books
1904 non-fiction books
Art Nouveau works
Animals in art
1899 in biology